The Original Harmony Ridge Creek Dippers is the first album by the Original Harmony Ridge Creekdippers, released in 1997.

For his first post-Jayhawks recording, Mark Olson returned to his folk and country roots and with the help of his wife Victoria Williams and multi-instrumentalist Mike "Razz" Russell, self-released The Original Harmony Ridge Creek Dippers.

It was re-issued in 2001 by Koch Records.

Reception

Writing for Allmusic, music critic William Ruhlman called the album "a low-key effort that takes a distinctly homemade approach... As commercial releases go, one would have to call it underperformed and under-produced, with the feel of late-night exhaustion and dreamlike expression."

Track listing
All songs by Mark Olson otherwise noted.
 "Flowering Trees" – 3:13 
 "When School Begins" (Olson, Victoria Williams) – 2:37 
 "Run with the Ponies" – 3:48 
 "Be on My Way Home" – 2:26 
 "She Picks the Violets" – 2:33 
 "Valentine King" – 3:45 
 "Eyes are the Window" – 3:13 
 "Humming Bird" (Olson, Williams) – 3:05 
 "Mr. Parker" – 4:11 
 "Jericho" (Olson, Williams) – 3:02

Personnel
Mark Olson – guitar, vocals, harmonica
Victoria Williams – background vocals
Mike Russell – guitar, mandolin, fiddle

References

1997 debut albums
Original Harmony Ridge Creekdippers albums